Santos Dumont (formerly known as Palmira) is a municipality in southern Minas Gerais state, Brazil. It lies at an elevation of  just off the main  interstate highway, BR040, between the urban centers of Barbacena (north) and Juiz de Fora (south). It became a city in 1889.

Climate

Economy

Agriculture

The region produces corn, strawberries, guava, nectaries, manioc, beans, oranges, coffee, peach and banana.

Industry
Santos Dumont has the Companhia Brasileira de Carbureto de Cálcio, (CBCC), which produces silicone iron and metallic silicone, exporting to several countries.

History
Santos Dumont is the birthplace of aviation pioneer Alberto Santos-Dumont and is named in his honour. Prior to the renaming the city was known as Palmira. It is located in the house where he was born and has personal objects, photos and an aviation museum.

Demographics
Since the 1980s the municipality has been experiencing a period of slight demographic standstill. Between the census held in 1996 and the census held in 2000 the population increased at the rate of 0.32% per annum which is much lower than other places in the country. This is partially explained by the economic attraction of the nearby city of Juiz de Fora, making it the destination of many immigrants.

According to the 2000 census, the average income of the workers of the municipality was calculated at R$450 (237 USD at that time), but workers earning less than the national minimum wage (R$151, 80 USD) accounted for 38.8% of the total employees, meanwhile only 1.00% of them earned more than the equivalent to 20 minimum wages (R$3,020 or 1,590 USD).

Tourism 
Santos Dumont has a rich tourism. It includes the Estrada Real (Royal Road, a set of colonial-era roads in Brazil), associated to an ecological tourism. There are 10 Kilometers of road until the division with the town of Antônio Carlos. During the route, it is possible to observe a nice natural landscape, old farms and two fountains, from the time of their construction, also well some rock records. Theses fountains were used for a parade of drovers while came from the interior of Minas Gerais, bringing gold to Rio de Janeiro, at the time of Colonial Brazil.

Besides that, in the city stand out the Cabangu Museum birthplace of Alberto Santos Dumont, in the district of Mantiqueira, 16 km from the city center.

The Ponte Preta Dam, in the neighborhood of Ponte Preta, allows leisure activities where people go swimming, boating, fishing, camping and spending the day free for leisure. 
From September to January, the dam is empty, but on-site leisure activities are possible such as campgrounds and events like “Off Road”.

Sports
The local football club, Mineiro Futebol Clube play in a small stadium north of the city center.

See also
List of municipalities in Minas Gerais

References

External links

Municipalities in Minas Gerais